Mudalcheri is a village in the Pattukkottai taluk of Thanjavur district, Tamil Nadu, India.

Demographics 

As per the 2001 census, Mudalcheri had a total population of 2216 with 1100 males and 1116 females. The sex ratio was 1015. The literacy rate was 73.42.

References 

Villages in Thanjavur district